The R667 road is a regional road in Ireland. The route runs from its junction with the N8 1 km from Kilworth for approximately 5 km until it meets the R666 road northeast of Fermoy. The R667 was once part of the main road from Dublin to Cork, and was mapped as such by Herman Moll in his New Map of Ireland in 1714. The road is located entirely in County Cork.

See also
Roads in Ireland
Motorways in Ireland
National primary road
National secondary road
History of roads in Ireland

References

Roads Act 1993 (Classification of Regional Roads) Order 2006 – Department of Transport

Regional roads in the Republic of Ireland
Roads in County Cork